The 2001 Memphis Tigers football team represented the University of Memphis in the 2001 NCAA Division I-A football season. Memphis competed as a member of the Conference USA.  The team was led by head coach Tommy West.  The Tigers played their home games at the Liberty Bowl Memorial Stadium.

Roster

Schedule

References

Memphis
Memphis Tigers football seasons
Memphis Tigers football